Andreas Acrivos (born 13 June 1928) is the Albert Einstein Professor of Science and Engineering, Emeritus at the City College of New York. He is also the director of the Benjamin Levich Institute for Physicochemical Hydrodynamics.

Education and career

Born in Athens, Greece, Acrivos moved to the United States to pursue an engineering education. He received a bachelor's degree from Syracuse University in 1950, a master's degree from the University of Minnesota in 1951, and a Ph.D. from the University of Minnesota in 1954; all in chemical engineering.

Acrivos is considered to be one of the leading fluid dynamicists of the 20th century. In 1954 Acrivos joined the faculty at the University of California, Berkeley. In 1962, he moved to Stanford University, where he worked with Professor David Mason to build chemical engineering programs. In 1977, he was elected as a member into the National Academy of Engineering for contributions in the application of mathematical analysis to the understanding of fundamental phenomena in chemical engineering processes. In 1987 Acrivos joined as the Albert Einstein Professor of Science and Engineering at The City College of the City University of New York, succeeding Veniamin Levich.

From 1982 to 1997 Acrivos served as the editor-in-chief of Physics of Fluids.

Awards and honors
National Medal of Science, 2001
 Fellow of the American Academy of Arts and Sciences, 1993
Fluid Dynamics Prize, 1991
G. I. Taylor Medal, Society of Engineering Science, 1988
 Elected as a member into the National Academy of Engineering, 1977
Acrivos has been listed as an ISI Highly Cited Author in Engineering by the ISI Web of Knowledge, Thomson Scientific Company.

References

External links

1928 births
Living people
City College of New York faculty
Fluid dynamicists
Greek emigrants to the United States
20th-century Greek physicists
Members of the United States National Academy of Sciences
Members of the United States National Academy of Engineering
National Medal of Science laureates
Engineers from Athens
Stanford University School of Engineering faculty
University of Minnesota College of Science and Engineering alumni
UC Berkeley College of Engineering faculty
Fellows of the American Physical Society
Fellows of the American Academy of Arts and Sciences
American chemical engineers
Fellows of Clare Hall, Cambridge
Minnesota CEMS
Physics of Fluids editors